James W. Knepper, Jr. (May 12, 1932 – May 30, 2016) was a Republican member of the Pennsylvania House of Representatives. He died of cancer in 2016 at the age of 84.

References

Republican Party members of the Pennsylvania House of Representatives
State cabinet secretaries of Pennsylvania
2016 deaths
1932 births
People from Bellefonte, Pennsylvania
Carnegie Mellon University alumni